Muzaffar Tursunkhujaev (born 16 January 1998) is a visually impaired Uzbekistani Paralympic swimmer. He represented Uzbekistan at the 2016 Summer Paralympics in Rio de Janeiro, Brazil and he won two bronze medals: in the men's 50 metre freestyle S13 and men's 100 metre butterfly S13 events. He also competed at the 2020 Summer Paralympics held in Tokyo, Japan.

At the 2019 World Para Swimming Championships held in London, United Kingdom, he won the bronze medal in the men's 50 metres freestyle S13 event.

References

External links 
 

Living people
1998 births
Place of birth missing (living people)
Swimmers at the 2016 Summer Paralympics
Swimmers at the 2020 Summer Paralympics
Medalists at the 2016 Summer Paralympics
Paralympic bronze medalists for Uzbekistan
Uzbekistani male freestyle swimmers
Paralympic swimmers with a vision impairment
Paralympic swimmers of Uzbekistan
S13-classified Paralympic swimmers
Medalists at the World Para Swimming Championships
Paralympic medalists in swimming
Male butterfly swimmers
21st-century Uzbekistani people
Uzbekistani blind people